Kuopio Ice Hall (unofficially ) or Olvi Arena, is the ice hockey arena located in the Hatsala district of Kuopio, Finland which is also the home arena of KalPa. The arena is built in 1979.

The ice hall can hold a maximum number of 5,300 spectators in the stands.

References

Indoor ice hockey venues in Finland
Indoor arenas in Finland
Ice Hall
Buildings and structures in North Savo
KalPa